Hilarographa sipiroca is a species of moth of the family Tortricidae. It is found on Sumatra in western Indonesia.

The wingspan is about 27 mm. The ground colour of the forewings is creamish, slightly suffused with ferruginous in the form of transverse lines. The costal area is pale orange ferruginous. The hindwings are yellow orange.

Etymology
The name refers to the type locality.

References

Moths described in 2009
Hilarographini